Sandrine Bisson (born June 22, 1975 in Quebec City, Quebec) is a Canadian actress from Quebec. She won the Jutra Award for Best Supporting Actress at the 12th Jutra Awards in 2010 for her performance in 1981, and was a nominee in the same category at the 14th Jutra Awards in 2012 for Fear of Water (La peur de l'eau) and at the 17th Jutra Awards in 2015 for 1987, and a Canadian Screen Award nominee at the 3rd Canadian Screen Awards in 2015 for 1987.

She has also acted in television and on stage.

References

External links

1975 births
Canadian film actresses
Canadian television actresses
Canadian stage actresses
Actresses from Quebec City
French Quebecers
Living people
Best Supporting Actress Jutra and Iris Award winners